Bagdadia tricornis is a moth in the family Gelechiidae. It was described by Yang and Li in 2015. It is found in China (Hainan).

The wingspan is 8−10 mm. The forewings are yellowish brown, sprinkled with black and greyish white scales and three small scale tufts near the base, around them greyish white mixed with black scales. The costal margin has scale tufts at one-fourth, halfway and two-thirds. The hindwings are grey.

Etymology
The species name refers to the process of the valve and is derived from Latin tricornis (meaning triangular).

References

Moths described in 2015
Bagdadia